The South American foxes (Lycalopex), commonly called raposa in Portuguese, or zorro in Spanish, are a genus from South America of the  subfamily Caninae. Despite their name, they are not true foxes, but are a unique canid genus more closely related to wolves and jackals than to true foxes; some of them resemble foxes due to convergent evolution. The South American gray fox, Lycalopex griseus, is the most common species, and is known for its large ears and a highly marketable, russet-fringed pelt.

The second-oldest known fossils belonging to the genus were discovered in Chile, and date from 2.0 to 2.5 million years ago, in the mid- to late Pliocene. The Vorohué Formation of Argentina has provided older fossils, dating to the Uquian to Ensenadan (Late Pliocene).

Names 
The common English word "zorro" is a loan word from Spanish, with the word originally meaning "fox". Current usage lists Pseudalopex (literally: "false fox") as synonymous with Lycalopex ("wolf fox"), with the latter taking precedence. In 1895, Allen classified Pseudalopex as a subgenus of Canis, establishing the combination Canis (Pseudalopex), a name still used in the fossil record.

Species 
Species currently included in this genus include:

In 1914, Oldfield Thomas established the genus Dusicyon, in which he included these zorros. They were later reclassified to Lycalopex (via Pseudalopex) by Langguth in 1975.

Phylogeny 
The following phylogenetic tree shows the evolutionary relationships between the Lycalopex species, based on molecular analysis of mitochondrial DNA control region sequences.

Relationship with humans 
The zorros are hunted in Argentina for their durable, soft pelts. They are also often labelled 'lamb-killers'.

The Fuegian dog, also known as the Yaghan dog, was a domesticated form of the culpeo (Lycalopex culpaeus), unlike other domesticated canids which were dogs and silver foxes. This means different canid species have been domesticated multiple times by humans independently.

References

Further reading 
 Nowak, Ronald M. (2005). Walker's Carnivores of the World. Baltimore: Johns Hopkins Press. 

Taxa named by Hermann Burmeister